Hyun-joo, also spelled Hyun-ju, is a Korean unisex given name, predominantly feminine. The meaning differs based on the hanja used to write each syllable of the name. There are 35 hanja with the reading "hyun" and 55 hanja with the reading "joo" on the South Korean government's official list of hanja which may be used in given names. Hyun-joo was the fourth-most popular name for baby girls born in South Korea in 1970.

People with this name include:

Sportspeople
Sin Hyeon-ju (born 1934), South Korean male sport shooter
Lee Hyeon-ju (born 1953), South Korean female figure skater
Bang Hyun-joo (born 1966), South Korean male sport shooter
Lee Hyun-joo (volleyball) (born 1976), South Korean female volleyball player
Choi Hyeon-ju (born 1984), South Korean female archer
Kim Hyun-joo (swimmer) (born 1986), South Korean female swimmer
Jo Hyun-joo (born 1992), South Korean female artistic gymnast
Ri Hyon-ju (born 1996), North Korean male diver

Entertainers
Son Hyun-joo (born 1965), South Korean actor
Kim Hyun-joo (born 1978), South Korean actress
Han Ga-in (born Kim Hyun-joo, 1981), South Korean actress
Gong Hyun-joo (born 1984), South Korean actress
Jessi (musician) (born Ho Hyun-ju, 1988), American singer in the South Korean entertainment industry
Lee Hyun-joo (born 1998), South Korean female singer, former member of April and Uni.T

Other
Juju Chang (Korean name Chang Hyunju; born 1965), South Korean-born American female television journalist
Grace Jung (born Jung Hyeon-ju, 1987), South Korean-born American writer

See also
List of Korean given names

References

Korean unisex given names